Solara may refer to:

 "Solara" (song), 2018 single by the Smashing Pumpkins
 Solara, an original character from the comic book series Marvel Nemesis: Rise of the Imperfects
 Solara, limited edition models of the Mitsubishi Magna
 Talbot Solara, a saloon version of the Simca 1307 automobile
 Toyota Camry Solara, a mid-size coupe/convertible
 Solara (album)